Glacier Bight is an open embayment about  wide, indenting the north coast of Thurston Island between Hughes Peninsula and Noville Peninsula. It was first delineated from air photos taken by U.S. Navy Operation Highjump in December 1946, and was named by the Advisory Committee on Antarctic Names for the icebreaker USS Glacier, the first ship ever to make its way to this coastal area, in February 1960.

Maps
 Thurston Island – Jones Mountains. 1:500000 Antarctica Sketch Map. US Geological Survey, 1967.
 Antarctic Digital Database (ADD). Scale 1:250000 topographic map of Antarctica. Scientific Committee on Antarctic Research (SCAR). Since 1993, regularly upgraded and updated.

References

Bays of Ellsworth Land
Thurston Island